Jean-Louis Garcia (born 20 September 1962) is a French football manager and former player who was most recently the manager of Belgian First Division A side RFC Seraing.

Club career
Garcia was a goalkeeper for many clubs including AS Cannes, AS Monaco, SO Châtellerault, AS Nancy and FC Nantes. As a player, he had quite a successful career apart from one game in Europe in 1995 against Bayer Leverkusen. Nantes had no other goalkeepers – David Marraud, Éric Loussouarn and Dominique Casagrande were injured. Therefore, Garcia, who had not played for two years, played in goal, conceding five goals during the match.

Coaching career
As a coach, he was firstly assistant goalkeeper coach to Nantes between 1995 and 1998, then took charge of the reserves at FC Girondins de Bordeaux from 1999 to 2003. He finally became a proper manager at Sporting Toulon Var, staying there from 2003 until 2006. He joined Angers SCO in June 2006, replacing Stéphane Paille.

On 28 May 2019, he was appointed manager of AS Nancy. On 20 May 2021, he was replaced as manager by Daniel Stendel.

Managerial statistics

References

1962 births
Living people
People from Ollioules
Sportspeople from Var (department)
Association football goalkeepers
French footballers
French football managers
Ligue 1 players
Ligue 2 players
AS Cannes players
AS Monaco FC players
AS Nancy Lorraine players
FC Nantes players
SC Toulon managers
Angers SCO managers
RC Lens managers
LB Châteauroux managers
Grenoble Foot 38 managers
ES Troyes AC managers
AS Nancy Lorraine managers
SO Châtellerault players
FC Montceau Bourgogne players
Ligue 1 managers
Ligue 2 managers
Footballers from Provence-Alpes-Côte d'Azur